Johann Rudolph Rengger was a Swiss naturalist and doctor, author of a book on exploration in Paraguay.

He published a work on the physiology of insects. He also studied the fauna of Paraguay, and published in 1835 a Reise nach Paraguay in den Jahren 1818 bis 1826.

Early life 
Johann Rudolf Rengger was born in Baden as the son of the pastor Samuel Rengger. Since his parents died early, his uncle Albrecht Rengger, then Interior Minister of the Helvetic Republic, provided his education, first at a private school, and then at the canton school of Aarau from 1805 to 1812. He later studied natural sciences and medicine in Lausanne and Tübingen. In 1817 he published the results of his research on insects under the title Physiological investigations on the animal housekeeping of Insects and thus earned on October 12 of the same year the degree of Doctor of Medicine.

The Paraguayan trip 
After a stay in Paris, Rengger decided, together with doctor M. Longchamp from the canton of Vaud, to undertake a research trip to South America. On May 1, 1818, they embarked in Le Havre and arrived in Buenos-Aires on July 1. Here, their attention soon turned on to the secure conditions of Paraguay. So they went up to the Entre Ríos Province, waited for eight months in Corrientes when the leader Artigas had blocked the stream traffic, and reached Asunción on July 30, 1819. Afterwards, Rengger began to explore the wildlife of Paraguay, and he described himself the way he conducted his research:

However, at the time of these explorations, Paraguay was virtually isolated from the outside world by the dictator José Gaspar Rodríguez de Francia. For example, the French explorer and botanist Aimé Bonpland was arrested as a spy and detained at Santa Maria. On their side, Rengger and Lonchamp were not allowed to cross the strictly guarded border, and had to request a special permit for each excursion. While Longchamp mostly remained in the capital, Rengger used all the permissions given for his naturalist research. Despite this scientific activity, there was a lack of contact with educated men and correspondence with foreign countries, especially with the homeland, because the dictator had all incoming and outgoing letters embezzled, so that the relatives of Rengger received only a few news from his situation. In 1825, Rengger unexpectedly obtained an exit permit, but had only a few hours to prepare himself with Longchamp, packing the smaller part of his collections. On May 25, 1825, they left Paraguay, returning to Le Havre via Buenos-Aires, Bahia, and Pernambuco.

Return in Europe 
On February 25, 1826, after almost eight years of absence, Rengger entered the European soil again. After a short stay in Paris, where he became acquainted with Alexander von Humboldt and Georges Cuvier, Rengger arrived in Aarau on March 16. He immediately proceeded to compile his careful and exact observations, and present the results of his research. However, because the enigmatic personality of the dictator of Paraguay questioned people, Rengger first published the Historical essay on the revolution of Paraguay and the Dictatorial government of Doctor Francia (1827). Book sections concerning the dictator previously appeared under the title Doctor Francia in the Stuttgarter Morgenblatt (1827, No. 140-145), a publication that prompted the dictator to answer (The Times, November 6, 1830). Rengger then completed his work of the natural history and published his book on the mammal world of Paraguay, which met with great interest in scientific circles (1830). After that, he worked on a description of his journey to Paraguay intended for a larger group of readers.

In the fall of 1831, he travelled to Italy. On February 15, 1832, in Naples, Rengger fell ill with pneumonia. After a partial recovery, he could travel back to his homeland. His condition worsened again and he died on October 9, 1832, in Aarau. In 1835, his uncle Albrecht Rengger and his brother-in-law Ferdinand Wydler published the Journey to Paraguay. The book contains valuable fragments about land, people, and animals.

Taxonomic descriptions 
Johann Rudolph Rengger described several taxa:
 an echimyid rodent, the long-tailed spiny rat: Proechimys longicaudatus (Rengger, 1830) ;
 a chinchillid rodent, the plains viscacha: Viscacia (Rengger, 1830), which is a genus synonym for Lagostomus ;
 a cricetid rodent, the large vesper mouse: Calomys callosus (Rengger, 1830) ;
 a primate, the Azaras's capuchin: Cebus azarae (Rengger, 1830), which is a species synonym for Sapajus cay ;
 an orb web weaving spider: Parawixia bistriata (Rengger, 1836).

See also 
 Bonpland, Aimé (1773-1858)
 von Humboldt, Alexander (1769-1859)

References 

Swiss naturalists
1795 births
1832 deaths